Randy Gevers (born 3 January 1981) is a Dutch motorcycle racer. He won the Dutch 250cc Championship in 2007.

Career statistics

Grand Prix motorcycle racing

By season

Races by year
(key)

References

External links
 Profile on MotoGP.com

1981 births
Living people
Dutch motorcycle racers
125cc World Championship riders
250cc World Championship riders
21st-century Dutch people